Khargupur is a town and a nagar panchayat in Gonda district in the Indian state of Uttar Pradesh.

Geography
It has an average elevation of 110 metres (360 feet).

Demographics
 India census, Khargupur had a population of 8,905. Males constitute 53% of the population and females 47%. Khargupur has an average literacy rate of 48%, lower than the national average of 59.5%: male literacy is 57%, and female literacy is 37%. In Khargupur, 16% of the population is under 6 years of age.

References

Cities and towns in Gonda district